Bushland Beach is a coastal suburb in the northern beaches area of Townsville in the City of Townsville, Queensland, Australia. In the  Bushland Beach had a population of 6,181 people.

Geography 

History 
The suburb of Bushland Beach was excised from the suburb of Mount Low. The name Bushland Beach was originally used as an estate name.

Bushland Beach is Townsville's only master planned beachside community, developed by the Sunland Group and it is known as one of the fastest growing suburbs in Townsville.

Education 
There are no schools in Bushland Beach. The nearest government primary school is North Shore State School in neighbouring Burdell to the south-east. The nearest government secondary school is Northern Beaches State High School in Deeragun to the south.

Amenities 
Bushland Beach is also home to its very own shopping centre which is anchored by a Coles as well as dominos, a dollar store, medical centre, two liquor stores, pharmacy, two hairdressing salons, real estate agent, pool shop and a cafe. In the future, the shopping centre will be extended which will include a Supa IGA and more specialty stores and a school has been proposed to be constructed in the near future.

Bushland Beach is home to the Bushland Beach Tavern, which is owned by the LH Group. Fishing, swimming and water activities are popular. The beach is well serviced with playgrounds, skatepark, and barbecue facilities .

There are a number of parks in the suburb, including:

 Bushland Beach Park
 Ocean Park Drive Park
There is a boat ramp and floating walkway on Marina Drive which gives access to Stony Creek off Bohle River. It is managed by the Townsville City Council.

Transport
The Route 33 Bus or Bushland Beach Bus as it is better known, services the area every day of the year, except for weekends and public holidays.

References

External links

 

Suburbs of Townsville